Fort St. George (or historically, White Town) is a fortress in the coastal city of Chennai, India. Founded in 1639, it was the first English (later British) fortress in India. The construction of the fort provided the impetus for further settlements and trading activity, in what was originally an uninhabited land. Thus, it is a feasible contention to say that the city (formerly named Madras) evolved around the fortress. The fort currently houses the Tamil Nadu legislative assembly and other official buildings.

History
The East India Company (EIC), which had entered India around 1600 for trading activities, had begun licensed trading at Surat, which was its initial bastion. However, to secure its trade lines and commercial interests in the spice trade, it felt the necessity of a port closer to the Malaccan Straits, and succeeded in purchasing a piece of coastal land, originally called Chennirayarpattinam or Channapatnam, where the Company began the construction of a harbour and a fort. The fort was completed on 23 April 1644 at a cost of £3,000, coinciding with St. George's Day, celebrated in honour of the patron saint of England. The fort, hence christened Fort St. George, faced the sea and some fishing villages, and it soon became the hub of merchant activity. It gave birth to a new settlement area called George Town (historically referred to as Black Town), which grew to envelop the villages and led to the formation of the city of Madras. It also helped to establish English influence over the Carnatic and to keep the kings of Arcot and Srirangapatna, as well as the French forces based at Pondichéry, at bay. In 1665, after the EIC received word of the formation of the new French East India Company, the fort was strengthened and enlarged while its garrison was increased.

According to the 17th-century merchant and traveller Thomas Bowrey, Fort St. George was:

without all dispute a beneficial place to the Honourable English India Company, and with all the Residence of theire Honourable Agent and Governour all of their Affaires Upon this Coast and the Coast of Gingalee, the Kingdoms also of Orixa, (Orissa) Bengala (Bengal), and Pattana (Patna), the said Governour and his Councell here resideigne, for the Honour of our English Nation keepinge and maintainneinge the place in great Splendour, Civil and good Government, Entertaineinge nobly all Foraign Embassadors, and provideinge great quantities of Muzlinge (Muslin) Callicoes (Calico) &c. to be yearly transported to England.

The Fort is a stronghold with  walls that withstood a number of assaults in the 18th century. It briefly passed into the possession of the French from 1746 to 1749, but was restored to Great Britain under the Treaty of Aix-la-Chapelle, which ended the War of the Austrian Succession.

The Fort now serves as one of the administrative headquarters for the legislative assembly of Tamil Nadu state and it still houses a garrison of troops in transit to various locations at South India and the Andamans. The Fort Museum contains many relics of the Raj era, including portraits of many of the Governors of Madras. The fort is maintained by the Archaeological Survey of India, with the administrative support of Indian Army.

The church
St. Mary's Church is the oldest Anglican church in India. It was built between 1678 and 1680 on the orders of the then Agent of Madras Streynsham Master. The tombstones in its graveyard are the oldest English or British tombstones in India. This ancient prayer house solemnised the marriages of Robert Clive and Governor Elihu Yale, who later became the first benefactor of Yale University in the United States.

Museum
The Fort Museum, which is the only ticketed institution of the  Archaeological Survey of India in the complex,  exhibits many items of the period of English and later British rule. This building was completed in 1795 and first housed the office of the Madras Bank. The hall upstairs was the Public Exchange Hall and served as a place for public meetings, lottery draws and occasional entertainment. These relics are reminders of British rule in India. The objects on display in the museum are the weapons, coins, medals, uniforms and other artefacts from England, Scotland, France and India dating back to the colonial period. Original letters written by Clive and Cornwallis make fascinating reading. One set of quaint period uniforms is displayed for viewing, as well. However, the pièce de resistance is a large statue of Lord Cornwallis.

The National Flag of India was designed by Pingali Venkayya and adopted in its present form during the meeting of the Constituent Assembly held on 22 July 1947, a few days before India's independence from Britain on 15 August 1947. The first ever flag flown after the independence is stored in the third floor of the museum. The public are allowed to see but not to touch or take photographs.

The museum is mentioned in the novel The Museum of Innocence, by the Turkish Nobel Laureate Orhan Pamuk.

Wellesley House
The first floor of the building includes the Banqueting Hall, which holds paintings of the Governor of the Fort and other high officials of the Regime. The canons of Tipu Sultan decorate the ramparts of the museum. The  statue stands at the entrance near a stairway in the museum. This statue was created by Charles Bank in England to be brought to India. The pedestal of the statue is carved with a scene depicting Tipu Sultan's emissary handing over Tipu's two sons as hostage in lieu of a ransom he was unable to pay to the British. It takes its name from Richard Wellesley, Governor General of India, and brother of the Duke of Wellington.

Flag staff
The flag staff at the fort is one of the tallest in the country.

Namakkal Kavingyar Maaligai

Namakkal Kavingyar Maaligai is a 10-storeyed building at the campus and is the power centre of state secretariat. It houses offices of the secretaries and departments.

In recent years
The entire complex is administered by the Department of Defence. The fort building is a three-storeyed one housing the offices of the chief minister and other ministers, the chief secretary, home ministry, treasury, etc. The remaining offices are housed in the 10-storeyed Namakkal Kavingyar Maaligai, which houses more than 30 departments.

The Fort St. George complex housed the administrative buildings of the Government of Tamil Nadu till March 2010. The Legislature of Tamil Nadu and the secretariat (with headquarters of various government departments) were situated in the fort. The fort itself was open to the public however only to a certain area. The main building or the secretariat was open only to government officials and the police. The cannons and the moat which guarded this old building have been left untouched. In 2010 the legislature and the secretariat moved to a new location and the old assembly complex was converted into a library for the Central Institute of Classical Tamil. Following the 2011 assembly elections and the return of J Jayalalithaa as the Chief Minister of the State, the Tamil Nadu Assembly and the Secretariat have been restored to Fort St. George.

Other monuments
An arch commemorating the diamond jubilee of Tamil Nadu Legislative Assembly is under construction near the Fort on Rajaji Salai close to Napier Bridge. The structure is a replica of Fort St. George's façade. The structure will be a mix of old and modern architecture, inspired by the frontage of Fort St. George. The legend 'Tamil Nadu Legislative Assembly diamond jubilee commemorative arch' would be inscribed in English and Tamil, in addition to the words '60 years'. The chief minister J Jayalalithaa laid the foundation stone for the arch on 30 October 2012. Earlier, the arch was planned to be constructed close to the entrance of Fort St. George, but was later relocated beyond the prohibitive zone, as per AMASR Act. A public interest litigation (PIL) was filed in the Madras High Court opposing the move stating that the arch would choke Rajaji Salai that leads to the High Court. However, the petition was dismissed by a division bench on 9 January 2013.

See also

 Heritage structures in Chennai
 History of Chennai
 List of Tamil Nadu Government Estates, Complexes, Buildings and Structures
 Tamil Nadu legislative assembly-secretariat complex
 Timeline of Chennai history (Section: 17th century)
 Fort William, India

References

External links

 Letters to Fort St. George
 Paintings of Fort St George
 The University of Houston Digital Library has a collection of historical photographs from the magazine India Illustrated.

1644 establishments in the British Empire
1644 in India
Administrative headquarters of state governments in India
British forts
Buildings and structures in Chennai
St. George
Heritage sites in Chennai
History of Chennai
Legislative buildings in India
Properties of the East India Company
Tamil Nadu Legislature
Tourist attractions in Chennai
Trading posts in India